The Latin Grammy Award for Best Traditional Tropical Album is an honor presented annually at the Latin Grammy Awards, a ceremony that recognizes excellence and creates a wider awareness of cultural diversity and contributions of Latin recording artists in the United States and internationally. The award goes to solo artists, duos, or groups for releasing vocal or instrumental albums containing at least 51% of new recordings in the traditional tropical music category which includes genres such as son, danzón, guaracha and bomba interpreted in a traditional style.

Musicians originating from Cuba have dominated the category though the award has also been presented to artists from Puerto Rico, Spain and the United States. It was first earned by Tito Puente with Mambo Birdland at the 1st Latin Grammy Awards ceremony held in 2000.

Cachao is the only artist to have won this category three times, the last one posthumously (the first one to be awarded in this fashion). Cachao also leads in number of nominations with four, followed by Ibrahim Ferrer and Eliades Ochoa with three nominations each. It is worth mentioning that Buena Vista Social Club members have been nominated ten times combined, excluding the two nominations by Juan de Marcos González (with Afro-Cuban All Stars and Sierra Maestra, respectively).
→

Winners and nominees

2000s

2010s

2020s

 Each year is linked to the article about the Latin Grammy Awards held that year.

See also
Grammy Award for Best Tropical Latin Album
Latin Grammy Award for Best Contemporary Tropical Album
Latin Grammy Award for Best Tropical Song

References

General
  Note: User must select the "Tropical Field" category as the genre under the search feature.

Specific

External links
Official site of the Latin Grammy Awards

 
Awards established in 2000
Traditional Tropical Album